Isaac Spratt (1799 – 1876) was a London toy dealer who wrote pamphlets describing the games of croquet and badminton and was influential in the early development of both.

It is known he was born in Ibsley, Hampshire and was married with four children. From 1840 he had a toy shop in 1, Brook Street (later no 18) in London's West End.

In 1856 he registered the first printed set of rules for the game of croquet and in 1860 printed a pamphlet called 'Badminton Battledore' a description of the ancient game of battledores and shuttlecocks as played competitively at Badminton House, the Duke of Beaufort's estate in Gloucestershire, England.

External links
Isaac Spratt, a Forgotten Pioneer of Croquet

1799 births
1876 deaths
Sportspeople from London
People from New Forest District
Badminton in England
Croquet
English croquet players
19th-century English businesspeople